{{Infobox concert tour
| concert_tour_name = Christina Aguilera in Concert
| image             = ChristinaA InConcertTourPoster.jpg
| image_size        = 220px
| artist            = Christina Aguilera
| location          = 
| albums            = Christina Aguilera Mi Reflejo (2001 shows)| start_date        = 
| end_date          = 
| number_of_legs    = 6
| number_of_shows   = 73 in North America1 in Europe5 in Latin America3 in Asia82 in total
| attendance        = 35,339
| gross             = $1,829,356 (2 shows)
| this_tour         = Christina Aguilera in Concert(2000–2001)
| next_tour         = The Justified & Stripped Tour(2003)
}}

Christina Aguilera in Concert was the debut concert tour by American singer Christina Aguilera. It supported her two studio albums, Christina Aguilera (1999) and Mi Reflejo (2000). Beginning in May 2000 with appearances at radio festivals in the United States, the tour continued into Canada. Here, Aguilera headlined Psyko Blast, a pop music tour created by Canadian network, YTV. The singer returned to the US performing at state and county fairs before headlining shows in amphitheatres and arenas. The tour continued into 2001, visiting Mexico, Puerto Rico, Panama, Venezuela and Japan. Sponsors of the tour included Sears, Levi's, J-Wave and Pioneer.

Background 
On April 27, 2000, it was announced that Christina Aguilera would start her first headlining concert tour in order to support her two studio albums, Christina Aguilera (1999) and Mi Reflejo (2000). According to MTV News, her tour was being co-sponsored by Sears and Levi's and would hit 35 cities.

Critical reception
Emily Flynn from Traverse City Record-Eagle wrote that Aguilera gave an amazing show at the National Cherry Festival. She continues, "As the sun dipped its way behind the horizon, sparkling eyes filled with amazement lit up the night sky. Whether a genie or not, Aguilera was out of the bottle Wednesday night, granting everyone's wish for an unforgettable concert". Errol Nazareth from Toronto Sun, gave the singer's show at the Air Canada Centre four out of five stars. He writes, And it's during ballads like 'I Turn To You' and 'Reflection' that her voice really shone. It's big, soulful and boasts an impressive range. But, while Aguilera says she'd rather let her music speak for itself, you can't help but draw parallels to Whitney Houston and Mariah Carey".

Pat St. Germain from Winnipeg Sun thought Aguilera's voice was the star of the show. He goes on to write, "The diminutive 19-year-old singer with the big R&B voice kept the energy at maximum level as she rolled right into 'Somebody's Somebody', prowling the stage with six backup dancers and bringing most of the crowd to its feet". For the concert at Edmonton's Skyreach Centre. Mike Ross from Edmonton Sun said that the singer proved to be on a higher level than Spears. He says, "Aguilera proved to be no ordinary pop tart. In both material and vocals, she's superior to her best friend/rival Britney Spears, even if she doesn't draw the same numbers. Isn't that the way it always is"?

The concert at the Missouri State Fair was applauded by Kevin C. Johnson from St. Louis Post-Dispatch. He comments, "Her big moment to break out came with her pull-out-all-stops cover of Etta James' "At Last"—a song she's been working to death the last several months in her attempt to prove her capabilities". The praise continued for the show at the Douglas County Fair. Kim Roberts from Omaha World-Herald states, "Her incredible range and powerful voice is surprising from one so petite, and her moves, as well as those of her dancers, captivated the audience".

Brad Cawn from Chicago Tribune writes the singer's show at the famed United Center was not what he was expecting. He continues, "Her long tresses came straight out of Madonna's Blond Ambition World Tour; her song-ending vocal riffing right from Mariah Carey's sky-high multi-octave schtick; and the starkly modern stage was more 'N Sync than Nickelodeon. Playing to both sides of her image, she left her belly button exposed, and flirted conservatively—if there is such a thing—with the vague sexuality of the music penned for her". Ed Masley from Pittsburgh Post-Gazette states Aguilera charmed her hometown crowd at the Post-Gazette Pavilion, giving the audience a "live" show. He goes on to say "As she proved repeatedly last night, she has the voice to be a major force in R&B for years to come. But this could be her only chance to be the second biggest female artist of her generation with the lunchbox set".

Roger Moore from The Orlando Sentinel'' comments that Aguilera proved to be "real" for her concert at the TD Waterhouse Centre—in comparison to Spears (who performed at the same venue two weeks before Aguilera). He says, "Of course, it's like comparing Gouda with Cheez Whiz. Britney was all over-choreographed, pre-packaged, and tape-recorded. Christina, on the other hand, is the real deal. Real stage banter. Real stage presence. Heck, real singing. What a relief to hear a bubble-gummer with real pipes tear into her tunes, letting six back-up dancers do the heavy lifting and leaving the tape recording to NBC's Olympics coverage".

Broadcasts and recordings
While headlining Psykoblast Tour in Canada, the final concert in Vancouver premiered on August 2, 2000. Called, "Christina: Live from Vancouver", the concert special aired on CTV and YTV. Selections from the concert were available on online on "Click2Music". In London, her performance at Party in the Park aired on T4 lived. In 2001, her concert at the NHK Hall in Tokyo aired on MTV Japan on February 9, 2001. The concert was streamed live on the day of the concert via Aguilera's "Click2Music" website.

Opening acts

Destiny's Child 
soulDecision 
Sygnature 
McMaster & James 
Alecia Elliott 
The Moffats 
Mytown  

Before Dark 
Faze 4 
Christian Davis 
Brownskin 
DisGuyz 
Jyve V 
Son Miserables

Setlist
The following setlist was obtained from the concert held on October 19, 2000; at the KeyArena in Seattle, Washington. It does not represent all concerts for the duration of the tour.
"Genie in a Bottle"
"Somebody's Somebody"
"So Emotional"
"Ven Conmigo (Solamente Tú)"
"I Turn to You"
"When You Put Your Hands On Me"
"Contigo en la Distancia"
"All Right Now"
"Love For All Seasons"
"At Last"
"Come On Over Baby (All I Want Is You)" 
Encore
"What a Girl Wants"

Tour dates 

Festivals and other miscellaneous performances

This concert was a part of the "Tulip Time Festival"
This concert was a part of KISS 95.1's "Kiss Music Mania"
This concert was a part of "Zootopia"
This concert was a part of Kiss 108's "Kiss Concert"
This concert was a part of Q 102's "Q Concert"
This concert was a part of "Summerfest"
This concert was a part of the "Sioux Empire Fair"
This concert was a part of the "National Cherry Festival"
These concerts were a part of YTV "Pysko Blast"
This concert was a part of "Party in the Park"
This concert was a part of the "California Mid-State Fair"
This concert was a part of "MontanaFair"
This concert was a part of the "North Dakota State Fair"
This concert was a part of the "Buffalo County Fair"
This concert was a part of the "Douglas County Fair"
This concert was a part of the "Iowa State Fair"
This concert was a part of the "Illinois State Fair"
This concert was a part of the "Missouri State Fair"
This concert was a part of the "Ohio State Fair"
This concert was a part of the "Midland County Fair"
This concert was a part of the "Kentucky State Fair"
This concert was a part of the "Minnesota State Fair"
This concert was a part of the "Champlain Valley Fair"
This concert was a part of the "State Fair of Texas"
This concert was a part of "Tiger Jam III"
This concert was a part of WXYV-FM's "Holiday Blast"
This concert was a part of WBLI's "Annual Christmas Show"
This concert was a part of 92 PRO-FM's "Jingle Mingle"
This concert was a part of 98PXY's "Jingle Jam"
This concert was a part of KIIS-FM's "Holiday Jingle Ball"
This concert was a part of WNCI's "Jingle Ball"
This concert was a part of WKTU's "Miracle on 34th Street"
This concert was a part of the "Caracas Pop Festival"

Cancellations and rescheduled shows

Box office score data

Personnel
Music Director: Alex Alessandroni
Drums: Brian Frasier-Moore
Keyboards: Ezequiel "Cheche" Alara and Alex Alessandroni
Guitar: Rafael Moreira
Bass: Reggie Hamilton
DJ: Adam 12
Backing Vocalists: Diane Gordon and Yvinn Patrick
Dancers: Nancy Anderson, Tiffani Manabat, Buddy Mynatt, Angel Ramos, Jorge Santos and Rob Vinson

See also 
 List of Christina Aguilera concerts
 List of Christina Aguilera concert tours

References

External links
 Christina Aguilera Official Website

Christina Aguilera concert tours
2000 concert tours
2001 concert tours